A Room for Three (Spanish: Habitación para tres) is a 1952 Spanish comedy film directed by Antonio de Lara and starring Carolina Giménez, Armando Moreno and Manolo Gómez Bur.

Main cast
 Carolina Giménez as Alicia
 Armando Moreno as Carlos
 Manolo Gómez Bur as Enriqueta
 José Luis Ozores as Felipe Mendigurría 
 Manuel Arbó 
 Matilde Muñoz Sampedro as Carlota - madre de Alicia
 Fernando Aguirre 
 Manuel Guitián 
 Antonio Riquelme hijo 
 Josefina Bejarano 
 Pedro Valdivieso
 Manuel Fernández Pin
 Julia Martínez as Titina
 Fernando Montijano 
 Gregorio Escolar 
 José Cualladó

References

Bibliography 
 Bentley, Bernard. A Companion to Spanish Cinema. Boydell & Brewer 2008.

External links 
 

1952 comedy films
Spanish comedy films
1952 films
1950s Spanish-language films
Films directed by Antonio de Lara
Spanish black-and-white films
1950s Spanish films